Borophene is a crystalline atomic monolayer of boron, i.e., it is a two-dimensional allotrope of boron and  also known as boron sheet.
First predicted by theory in the mid-1990s,
different borophene structures were experimentally confirmed in 2015.

Properties 
Experimentally various atomically thin, crystalline and metallic borophenes were synthesized on clean metal surfaces under ultrahigh-vacuum conditions. Its atomic structure consists of mixed triangular and hexagonal motifs, such as shown in Figure 1. The atomic structure is a consequence of an interplay between two-center and multi-center in-plane bonding, which is typical for electron deficient elements like boron.

Borophenes exhibit in-plane elasticity and ideal strength. It can be stronger than graphene, and more flexible, in some configurations. Boron nanotubes are also stiffer than graphene, with a higher 2D Young's modulus than any other known carbon and noncarbon nanostructures. Borophenes undergo novel structural phase transition under in-plane tensile loading due to the fluxional nature of their multi-center in-plane bonding. Hydrogen easily adsorbs to borophene, offers potential for hydrogen storage – over 15% of its weight. Borophene can catalyze the breakdown of molecular hydrogen into hydrogen ions, and reduce water.

History 

Computational studies by I. Boustani and A. Quandt showed that small boron clusters do not adopt icosahedral geometries like boranes, instead they turn out to be quasi-planar (see Figure 2). This led to the discovery of a so-called Aufbau principle that predicts the possibility of borophene (boron sheets), boron fullerenes (borospherene) and boron nanotubes.

Additional studies showed that extended, triangular borophene (Figure 1(c)) is metallic and adopts a non-planar, buckled geometry. Further computational studies, initiated by the prediction of a stable B80 boron fullerene, suggested that extended borophene sheets with honeycomb structure and with partially filled hexagonal holes are stable. These borophene structures were predicted to be metallic. The so-called γ sheet (a.k.a. β12 borophene or υ1/6 sheet) is shown in Figure 1(a).

The planarity of boron clusters was first experimentally confirmed by the research team of  L.-S. Wang.

After the synthesis of silicene, multiple groups predicted that borophene could potentially be realized with the support of a metal surface. In particular, the lattice structure of borophene was shown to depend on the metal surface, displaying a disconnect from that in a freestanding state.

In 2015 two research teams succeeded in synthesizing different borophene phases on silver (111) surfaces under ultrahigh-vacuum conditions. Among the three borophene phases synthesized (see Figure 1), the v1/6 sheet, or β12, was shown by an earlier theory to be the ground state on the Ag(111) surface, while the χ3 borophene was previously predicted by Zeng team in 2012. So far, borophenes exist only on substrates; how to transfer them onto a device-compatible substrate is necessary, but remains a challenge.

Atomic-scale characterization, supported by theoretical calculations, revealed structures reminiscent of fused boron clusters consisting of mixed triangular and hexagonal motives, as previously predicted by theory and shown in Figure 1. Scanning tunneling spectroscopy confirmed that the borophenes are metallic. This is in contrast to bulk boron allotropes, which are semiconducting and marked by an atomic structure based on B12 icosahedra.

In 2021 researchers announced hydrogenated borophene on a silver substrated, dubbed borophane. The new material was claimed to be far more stable than its component. Hydrogenation reduces oxidation rates by more than two orders of magnitude after ambient exposure. The creation of two-layer borophene was announced in August 2021.

See also 
Allotropes of boron
Borospherene

References

External links 

Allotropes of boron
Monolayers
Substances discovered in the 2010s